Parliamentary elections were held in The Gambia on 9 April 2022 to elect members of the 58-seat National Assembly.

The newly created National People's Party (NPP), led by incumbent President Adama Barrow, emerged victorious, winning 18 seats. The United Democratic Party (UDP) came second, winning 15 seats and becoming the largest opposition party. The National Reconciliation Party (NRP) won four seats, whilst the People's Democratic Organisation for Independence and Socialism (PDOIS) and the Alliance for Patriotic Reorientation and Construction (APRC) won two each. Twelve members elected were independents. As President, Barrow could appoint five additional members, and selected four from the NPP and one from the APRC. Barrow appointed APRC leader Fabakary Jatta as Speaker.

A three-party coalition was subsequently established between the NPP, NRP and APRC, giving the government 29 seats.

Electoral system
The 58 members of the National Assembly consist of 53 members elected from single-member constituencies by first-past-the-post voting and five members appointed by the President, including the Speaker and their deputies.

The Gambia uses a unique system of each voter casting a marble to their preferred candidate's ballot box.

Conduct
ECOWAS deployed 40 election observers to all the 7 administrative regions in the Gambia to monitor the electoral process. H.E. Mohamed Ibn Chambas, head of the ECOWAS observation mission, stated after observing the election process in the capital city of Banjul that the election was "conducted in a calm and transparent atmosphere, using the Gambian electoral process."

Results

References

General
Parliamentary elections in the Gambia
Gambia
Election and referendum articles with incomplete results
April 2022 events in Africa